Ancient Roman jewelry was characterized by an interest in colored gemstones and glass in contrast with their Greek predecessors, who focused primarily on the production of high-quality metalwork by practiced artisans. Extensive control of Mediterranean territories provided an abundance of natural resources to utilize in jewelry making. Participation in trade allowed access to both semi-precious and precious stones that traveled down the Persian Silk Road from the East. Various types of jewelry were worn by different genders and social classes in Rome, and were used both for aesthetic purposes and to communicate social messages of status and wealth. Throughout the history of the Roman Empire, jewelry style and materials were influenced by Greek, Egyptian, and Etruscan jewelry.

Materials and style 

While much emphasis is placed on fine gold and silver pieces of antiquated jewelry, many pieces worn by lower social classes in Rome would have been made out of bronze or other less expensive metals. Gold and silver pieces would have been worn by the wealthy. Unlike ancient Greek jewelers, Roman manufacturers would have dealt primarily with mass-produced pieces created using molds and casting techniques. This allowed more people to afford such accessories.

Roman aesthetic values led to the increased use of precious and semi-precious gemstones as well as colored glass in jewelry. Semi-precious stones such as garnet, emeralds, jasper, and lapis were imported from Egypt while onyx, amber, and moonstone came to Rome from the Persian Gulf. Ostentatious and creative use of color was valued over fine metalwork. Glass makers were supposedly so skilled that they could fool the public into thinking that glass beads and ornaments were actually gemstones. When genuine gems were utilized, the stones preferred by Roman women were amethyst, emerald, and pearl. Pearls were rare and expensive and were used in Roman jewelry up until the end of the Republic. Clusters of large pearl beads were used to make earrings called crotalia (rattles).

Social implications 

The focus on showiness and imitation of fine materials demonstrates the fact that Romans were highly conscious of how they presented themselves in public. While living, Roman men and women frequently used ornamentation of their houses and bodies to demonstrate wealth, power, influence, and knowledge.This representation changed over time, as noblewomen of the Republic's ornamentum symbolized familial status, while an Imperial noblewomen's ornamentation represented person achievement and status. Elites such as bureaucrats and senators wore gold rings featuring large flashy gemstones to signal status while plebeians wore iron rings except in circumstances where a gold one has been awarded.

Gender 
As with many societies, ancient Roman accessorizing varied along boundaries of gender and age, in addition to social standing. The elite women of Roman society were expected to wear an abundant amount extravagant and expensive gold jewelry to show their familial status.

Women 

Roman women collected and wore more jewelry than men. Women usually had pierced ears, in which they would wear one set of earrings. Additionally, they would adorn themselves with necklaces, bracelets, rings, and fibulae. One choker-style necklace, two bracelets, and multiple rings would be worn at once. Jewelry was particularly important to women because it was considered to be their own property, which could be kept independently of their husband's wealth and used as the women saw fit. They had the right to buy, sell, bequeath, or barter their own jewelry. Women in Ancient Rome were valued on their elegance in dress and adornment with extravagant jewelry. The way an elite woman accessorized and presented herself in public reflected the rank of her husband.

Men 
Typically Roman men wore less jewelry than their female counterparts. Finger rings and fibulae were the most common forms of jewelry worn by men, but they would also sometimes wear pendants. Roman men, unlike Greek men, wore multiple rings at once. Golden rings were reserved for men of senatorial rank.

Children 

Roman children's jewelry served special purposes, especially in the form of amulets. These were worn draped around the neck, and had specialized purposes to protect the children from illness and misfortune. For example, a phallic fascinus was commonly placed on or near a young boy to ward off the evil forces.Young elite boys wore these golden amulets referred to as bullae until they reached adulthood. Bullae were first created in Greece and became popularized in Rome over the course of the 3rd and 4th centuries BC.

Beyond accessories 
Collections of jewelry represented great wealth and power to the Roman owners. The use of this jewelry was not limited to simply wearing it, but also extended to spiritual purposes. Hoas of gold, silver, and bronze jewelry have been found at Greek and Roman temples, providing evidence that worshipers would have offered some of their jewelry to the god or goddess of the temple, much as they would have offered other objects. Inspired after the sack of Greek cities Tarentum, Syracuse, and Capua, it became increasingly popular for Romans to use gold wreaths or diadems in funerary practices for both men and women. These wreaths were made of delicate golden leaves and florals.

References 

Jewelry